Tom, Thomas or Tommy Sloan may refer to:
Thomas Sloan (1870–1941), Irish and British politician
Tom Sloan (footballer, born 1880), Scottish international footballer
Tom Sloan (footballer, born 1900) (1900–1973), Irish international footballer
Tom Sloan (television executive) (1919–1970), British television executive, broadcaster, and journalist
Thomas Sloan (Kansas politician) (born 1946), member of the Kansas House of Representatives
Tom Sloan (footballer, born 1959), also known as Tommy Sloan, Northern Irish footballer
Tommy Sloan (footballer, born 1925) (1925–2010), Scottish football player (Heart of Midlothian)
Tommy Sloan (footballer, born 1964), Scottish football player and manager (Auchinleck Talbot)
Thomas L. Sloan (1863–1940), first Native American lawyer to argue before the U.S. Supreme Court

See also
Sloan Thomas (born 1981), former American football wide receiver